The 2004 European Athletics Indoor Cup was held on 14 February 2004 at the Arena Leipzig in Leipzig, Germany. It was the second edition of the indoor track and field meeting for international teams, which featured the eight top performing nations from the 2003 European Cup. It was the second consecutive year that the event was held at the venue, following on from a successful hosting of the 2003 European Athletics Indoor Cup.

The competition featured nineteen athletics events, nine for men and ten for women. The 400 metres race were held in a dual final format due to size constraints, with athletes' being assigned final positions through their finishing times. The international team points totals were decided by their athletes' finishing positions, with each representative's performance contributing towards their national overall score.

The Russian women's team retained their title from the previous year, taking a comprehensive victory – seven of the ten women's events were won by Russians and the team was eighteen points clear of runner-up Germany. The men's side was a much more closely contested affair. The title was decided in the final Swedish medley relay event, with France just managing to maintain its lead and beat the Russian men by two points in the final rankings.

Results summary

Men

Women

Medal table
Key

References

Official site (archived)
Results
European Indoor Cup. GBR Athletics/Athletics Weekly. Retrieved on 2011-01-25.
2nd Indoor European Cup. European Athletics. Retrieved on 2011-01-25.

2004 Indoor
European Indoor Cup
Sports competitions in Leipzig
International athletics competitions hosted by Germany
2004 in German sport
2000s in Saxony